Ali Khademhosseini (born October 30, 1975, Tehran, Iran) is the Director and CEO of the Terasaki Institute and former professor at the University of California-Los Angeles where he held a multi-departmental professorship in Bioengineering, Radiology, Chemical, and Biomolecular Engineering and the Director of Center for Minimally Invasive Therapeutics (C-MIT). From 2005 to 2017, he was a professor at Harvard Medical School, and the Wyss Institute for Biologically Inspired Engineering. His studies have been cited ~100,000 times (H index = 160). Khademhosseini is best known for developing hydrogels for tissue engineering and bioprinting.

Khademhosseini is a recipient of The Massachusetts Institute of Technology Outstanding Undergraduate mentor award and a recipient of the Presidential Career Award for Scientists and Engineers by President Barack Obama.

Every year since 2014  he has been selected by Thomson Reuters as one of the World's Most Influential Minds. By the number of citations, he is the most cited author of in various journals in the field of biomaterials like Biomaterials, Advanced Healthcare Materials, Biofabrication, Tissue Engineering - Part B: Reviews.

Background and personal life 
Khademhosseini was born in Tehran, Iran, and grew up in Toronto, Canada.  He received his Ph.D. in bioengineering from MIT under the supervision of Robert S. Langer (2005), and MASc (2001) and BASc (1999) degrees from the University of Toronto both in chemical engineering.

Awards and honors 
Dr. Khademhosseini's interdisciplinary research has been recognized over 70 major national and international awards. He is a recipient of the 2011 Presidential Early Career Award for Scientists and Engineers (PECASE) by President Barack Obama, the highest honor given by the US government for early-career investigators. In 2007, he was named a TR35 recipient by the Technology Review Magazine as one of the world's top young innovators. In 2011, he received the Pioneers of Miniaturization Prize from the Royal Society of Chemistry (RSC) for his contribution to microscale tissue engineering and microfluidics.  In 2016, he received the Sr. Scientist Award of Tissue Engineering and Regenerative Medicine Society-Americas (TERMIS-AM) and in 2017 he received the Clemson Award of the Society for Biomaterials. In addition, he has received the young investigator awards of the Society for Biomaterials and the Tissue Engineering and Regenerative Medicine International Society-North America. He has also received the American Chemical Society's Viktor K. Lamer award and the Unilever award and has been recognized by major governmental Awards including the NSF Career award and the Office of Naval Research Young Investigator award. He has been elected into the Canadian Academy of Engineering as well as the Royal Society of Canada. He is a fellow of the American Institute of Medical and Biological Engineering (AIMBE), Biomedical Engineering Society (BMES), Royal Society of Chemistry (RSC), Biomaterials Science and Engineering (FBSE), Materials Research Society (MRS), NANOSMAT Society, and American Association for the Advancement of Science (AAAS). In 2019, he received the Mustafa Prize, for his work on microfabricated hydrogel for biomedical applications.

References

Sources & External links
 Harvard-MIT faculty profile
 TR35 profile
 NanoQuebec
 Regenerate tissue engineering conference
 Lab on a Chip
 U of T engineering speaker
 Microengineering the cellular environment
 Khademhosseini wins the Coulter Foundation Early Career Award
 Scholarly works by Khademhosseini
 HST faculty wins the BMW Scientific award

1975 births
Living people
MIT School of Engineering alumni
Harvard University faculty
Harvard Medical School faculty
Iranian emigrants to Canada
Iranian emigrants to the United Kingdom
Fellows of the American Institute for Medical and Biological Engineering
UCLA Henry Samueli School of Engineering and Applied Science faculty
Canadian bioengineers
Engineers from Toronto
Scientists from Toronto
Canadian chemical engineers
Canadian radiologists
American bioengineers
American chemical engineers
American radiologists
University of Toronto alumni
Engineers from Ontario
20th-century Canadian scientists
21st-century Canadian scientists
21st-century Canadian inventors
Fellows of the Royal Society of Chemistry
Iranian bioengineers